The Defence of Outpost Snipe in Egypt, took place in the Second Battle of El Alamein, part of the Western Desert campaign during the Second World War. Once consolidated, it could be used as a jumping-off point for an advance by the 24th Armoured Brigade.

From 26 to 27 October, the 2nd Rifle Brigade defeated numerous Axis armoured counter-attacks and withstood constant artillery bombardments and machine-gun fire, while knocking out  armoured vehicles, with intermittent support from the tanks and artillery of the 1st Armoured Division. The defence of Outpost Snipe managed to spoil the biggest Axis counter-attack against the positions captured by the Eighth Army during Operation Lightfoot; the battalion suffered 72 casualties. The fighting at Outpost Snipe led Rommel to write that an armoured attack, on ground which the defenders had been able to prepare, was unlikely to succeed.

Background

Operation Lightfoot

The Second Battle of El Alamein began with Operation Lightfoot, an Eighth Army plan for the main attack to be made in the north by XXX Corps (Lieutenant-General Willoughby Norrie) and a secondary attack in the south by XIII Corps (Lieutenant-General Oliver Leese), with X Corps (Lieutenant-General Herbert Lumsden) standing by to exploit success. Montgomery intended that two corridors were to be cut through the Axis minefields opposite the XXX Corps area.

Tanks would pass through the gaps and defeat the German armoured divisions. Diversions at Ruweisat Ridge in the centre and in the south were intended to convince the Axis that the main British effort would be in the south and the 10th Armoured Division moved behind XIII Corps to add to the impression. In the north, four infantry divisions of XXX Corps were to advance on a  front to the Oxalic Line, an objective beyond the forward Axis outposts. Engineers would then clear and mark the two lanes through the minefields and the armoured divisions of X Corps would pass through to gain the Pierson Line. The tanks would consolidate just west of the infantry positions, to intercept an armoured counter-attack against the infantry. The tanks would then advance to the next objective, Skinflint, deep inside the Axis defences and astride the Rahman track, to confront the Axis tanks. The Eighth Army infantry would continue to "crumble" the three lines of Axis fortifications and destroy any tanks that attacked them.

Prelude

2nd Rifle Brigade

The 2nd Rifle Brigade (Lieutenant-Colonel Victor Turner) was one of two battalions in the 7th Motor Brigade of the 1st Armoured Division. The motor battalions did not have four rifle companies and various support platoons, like normal infantry battalions. The 2nd Rifle Brigade had an establishment of an anti-tank company of sixteen 6-pounder anti-tank guns, three rifle companies, a scout platoon riding in eleven Universal Carriers, a platoon of 3-inch mortars and a machine-gun platoon with Vickers medium machine-guns, a scale of equipment which could generate much more fire power than a normal infantry battalion.

Operation Supercharge

The course of Operation Lightfoot led Rommel to commit the 90th Light Division from reserve to the north of the front. The move of the division in the coastal sector suggested that Rommel expected the next Eighth Army attack there. The Australian positions were taken over by a brigade of the 51st (Highland) Division and to the south, the 2nd New Zealand Division was withdrawn and replaced with the 1st South African Division by extending its right flank, as the 4th Indian Division further south did the same. In XIII Corps, the 7th Armoured Division was to conserve its strength, ready to move towards the coast as soon as the 21st Panzer Division was known to have moved north.

Major-General Raymond Briggs, the 1st Armoured Division commander, continued attempts to push forward the tanks to act as a shield for the infantry, by creating a firm base, despite the congestion caused by the division being superimposed on the 51st (Highland) Division. Arguments between the tank and infantry commanders as to the position of the front line had bedevilled co-operation, with the tank commanders insisting that their units were much further forward than the infantry commanders believed. The Eighth Army headquarters decided to end the bickering by having the troops light flares, which would be mapped from several locations to triangulate their positions but this took place too late to affect the operation. Two battalions of the 7th Motor Brigade (Brigadier Thomas Bosvile) were to advance either side of Kidney Ridge and occupy ground from which Axis anti-tank emplacements could be dominated and create a path for the 2nd and 24th Armoured brigades to advance.

Arguments about the location of infantry and tank units after Operation Lightfoot had not been resolved by a reconnaissance during the morning, as the flare-firing exercise had not begun, which left Turner in doubt about the battalion start line and the position of the objective. After the flares had been lit the confusion persisted, because the tanks units refused to accept the evidence that their map reading was even worse than that of the infantry. Late on 26 October, Turner referred this to the 7th Motor Brigade headquarters, who replied that it was too late to change plans.

Battle

26 October

Over the next , the battalion took twenty prisoners, scattered several parties of Axis infantry and moved for about  beyond a ridge, to what was thought to be Snipe, after a smoke shell was fired to mark the position by the British artillery. The lorries and Chevrolet  carrying the anti-tank guns, encountered long sandy ridges which slowed the journey but nineteen of the twenty-seven 6-pounders and the ammunition were unloaded and dug in by 

Six guns of 239/76th Anti-Tank Battery faced north and north east. The C Company carrier platoon patrolled to the west and found about  ready to surrender but before infantry arrived to collect them, the platoon ran into a laager of about  tanks (XII Armoured Battalion from the 133rd Armoured Division "Littorio") and German tanks,  (self-propelled anti-tank guns) and infantry. The British opened fire and set three lorries on fire but lost a carrier while withdrawing. Most of the prisoners ran away but  from Pioneer Battalion 220 of the 164th Light Afrika Division Pioneer Battalion 33 of the 15th Panzer Division.

Just before dawn, the lorries returned to the east with the prisoners. The depression and scrub were good cover and the infantry, some of whom had been in the desert since 1940, dug in deep.

27 October

Morning

As movement was seen in the German laager, the gun-crews in the north-west face of Outpost Snipe prepared to receive an attack but the German tanks moved westwards, away from the front line, which exposed them broadside to the British guns. The gunners opened fire and for thirty minutes the north end of the outpost disappeared in smoke, flying sand and explosions as Axis artillery and tanks replied to the anti-tank fire, until the tanks were out of range. Part of  had spent the night in a dip, reappeared  to the south-west of Snipe and also moved with their sides exposed to the British 6-pounders. The gunners claimed six German, eight Italian tanks and two  self-propelled guns destroyed and two tanks damaged, for the loss of three anti-tank guns knocked out and one sunk into the sand. Axis return fire caused several casualties and daylight showed that some of the guns were too exposed and needed to be re-sited.

The armoured brigades had been intended to join the parties at Snipe and Woodcock but the failure at Woodcock caused confusion and hesitation among the British tank units. The 47th Royal Tank Regiment (47th RTR) of the 24th Armoured Brigade, was under command of the 10th Armoured Division and drove over a ridge at  saw a post surrounded by German tanks  beyond, assumed it was a German laager and opened fire. Turner sent an officer back in a Bren Gun Carrier, who managed to get the most advanced tanks to stop after thirty minutes but the rest kept firing.

The German tanks were broadside on again and the British gunners immediately hit and set three more on fire; the 47th RTR machine-gunned the crews as they tried to escape. By  the 47th RTR had arrived at Snipe, which attracted a storm of artillery-fire and the outpost disappeared again in smoke, fire, explosions and flying sand. German tanks fired smoke shells at the British tanks and then anti-tank and tank gunners aimed at the smoke, which was much easier to see than the camouflaged vehicles. Soon the 47th RTR was down to five Shermans and six Crusaders and at  the tanks were ordered to retire with the 41st (Oldham) Royal Tank Regiment (41st RTR), which had lost another twelve tanks, ending a plan for the 24th Armoured Brigade to pivot to the south of Outpost Snipe into open ground.

The battalion Medical Officer and the ambulances had been left behind at the start line on 26 October and had been unable to move forward in daylight; the loss of the FOO during the night, made it impossible to direct plunging fire on the Axis artillery and tanks hidden in dips around the post. The outpost was also running short of ammunition and three carriers were loaded with the most badly wounded men, dashed for the ridge to the east and reached safety. The battalion ambulances and supply lorries were behind the ridge ready to move, along with a replacement FOO but nothing could make the return journey through the Axis artillery and machine-gun fire, which began as soon as a vehicle appeared above the crest. Around  Italian infantry were seen assembling opposite the western face of the outpost and carriers from a scout platoon sallied from the post to disperse them, inflicting many casualties and destroying two vehicles towing captured 6-pounders. Two anti-tank guns were moved to the south-west perimeter from the north, despite the Bren Gun Carriers not having towing attachments and dust thrown up by the move being shelled by Axis artillery, which killed four men.

Just as the guns were readied, thirteen Italian M13/40 tanks from the XIII Battalion appeared over the ridge to the west and about twenty German tanks of  used the attack as cover to advance from the hull-down ambush position to counter-attack the 24th Armoured Brigade, which had retired to similar positions behind the ridge to the east. The anti-tank guns along the western flank of Snipe opened fire and hit four Italian tanks at once, causing the rest to return to cover. The German tanks came into the open and exposed their sides to the Rifle Brigade gunners and then half of the German tanks turned towards the outpost to suppress the fire from the anti-tank guns, only to present their sides to the British tanks behind the ridge. The gunners at Snipe and the tank gunners ignored the vehicles heading towards them and concentrated on those which were broadside on. Eight German tanks were set on fire, several more began attempts to tow them away and the rest retreated.

Afternoon
Conditions inside Snipe worsened in the midday heat as the number of casualties increased, with little more than shell-dressings and water to tend them. Just before noon, six Bren Gun Carriers were hit and caught fire; the heat and smoke drifting over the guns making the visibility even worse. Many of the gunners were among the casualties and guns were kept in action with improvised crews and by men moving from one to the other. Only thirteen guns were still operational to cover the  perimeter and the guns along the south-west face became so short of ammunition that two men drove Jeeps back and forth to share out the remainder. Three of the remaining carriers took out more wounded but one was knocked out during the journey and at  Axis artillery and machine-gun fire increased. Eight Italian M13/40s, a self-propelled gun and infantry appeared over a ridge to the south-west, where only one 6-pounder was still in action.

With only two rounds left and the last three M13/40s pressing on, Lieutenant Toms left the gun to drive a jeep to the nearest knocked-out gun for ammunition and arrived back at the gun through machine-gun fire, which set the jeep petrol tank alight. Sergeant Calistan, the gun-layer, hit the three tanks and set them on fire, from which none of the crews escaped. After the attack there was a lull, apart from shelling which caused more casualties. Turner had been wounded unloading the jeep but visited the gun positions until the effects of his wounds became too serious; by  most of the officers were casualties and the guns were commanded by wounded NCOs. Briggs ordered forward the 2nd Armoured Brigade artillery, the 11th RHA and they drove their M7 Priests up the east side of the ridge to bombard Axis positions but managed only to hit Snipe again with 105 mm howitzer fire.

Rommel could see the fighting around Snipe from his headquarters and assembled the 90th Light Division and the 21st Panzer Division, which had been moved to the northern area of the battlefield overnight, with parts of the 15th Panzer Division, the 164th Light Afrika Division and a battlegroup of the 132nd Armoured Division "Ariete". As the formation of twenty , escorted by twenty Fiat CR.42s and twenty Bf 109s approached, it was intercepted by sixteen Curtiss P-40s of the 64th Fighter Squadron and the 65th Fighter Squadron, United States Army Air Forces (USAAF), which claimed six Axis fighters.

Part of the Axis tank force advanced against Australian positions near Point 29 to the north of Snipe; to the south about thirty German and ten Italian tanks advanced towards part of the 2nd Armoured Brigade. The anti-tank gunners knocked out nine tanks, damaged several and a 6-pounder crew from A Company claimed four more, after which the tanks withdrew to low ground near Kidney Ridge. The second wave of tanks attacked and fifteen Panzer IIIs turned towards the north-west perimeter of Snipe, where only two guns were operational. A third gun was hauled round in time to join in but there were only thirty armour-piercing rounds left. The tanks advanced cautiously along routes with cover and machine-gunned the 6-pounders as they came into view, driving the crews into slit trenches.

The third tank drove into cover, about  back, where the rest of the force rallied, less six tanks knocked out. The tanks machine-gunned the position, without exposing themselves to return fire from the anti-tank guns, for the rest of the day. About seventy Axis armoured vehicles littered the area and the 2nd Rifle Brigade had lost sixteen Bren Gun Carriers and ten 6-pounders, with another five damaged; at  a signal was sent to the 7th Motor Brigade about the tanks; reinforcements were promised but no armoured counter-attack was made. The 2nd Rifle Brigade burnt their codes and soon after, the light began to fade; at  the German tanks drove to the north-east where some were silhouetted and the British fired their last anti-tank ammunition, hitting one tank. Survivors from the posts around the perimeter began to move towards the command post, dragging wounded with them, under streams of bullets from Axis machine-guns being fired horizontally across the outpost.

28 October

After checking the 6-pounders to make sure they were incapable of firing, the last unwounded troops prepared for the relief but no sign of a relief party or the battalion transport appeared and at  the survivors of A and C companies withdrew with one 6-pounder, which was carried out on a damaged Chevrolet ; as both sides were out rescuing wounded and the party was not fired on. A relief force of the 5th Royal Sussex from the fresh 133rd Lorried Infantry Brigade (Brigadier Alec Lee) had set out when the brigade began to take over from the 7th Motor Brigade and the British bombardment had been fired as the 5th Royal Sussex advanced.

Aftermath

Analysis
Co-operation between the Rifle Brigade gunners and the tank gunners of the 24th Armoured Brigade on 27 October had been excellent but the imminence of Operation Supercharge and the fate of the tanks which reached Snipe on 27 October, left Briggs reluctant to risk more tanks. The attempt of the 1st Armoured Division to provide artillery support backfired, due to the chronic inability of the British commanders to agree where their units were (even after the location exercise with flares). Rommel had ordered a counter-attack by the  reserve, to restore the original German positions on a  front from El Wishka in the south to Point 29 in the north, which had been lost during Operation Lightfoot. Outpost Snipe was  behind the German front line, across the route of the right flank of the counter-attack of 27 October; Rommel wrote later of the "murderous fire", which "struck into our ranks" and stopped the biggest Axis counter-attack against XXX Corps; an armoured attack on ground where the defender had been able to prepare, was unlikely to succeed.

Casualties
Axis human losses were unknown but believed to be more than the Rifle Brigade losses. In 2001, Barrie Pitt gave  and self-propelled guns destroyed, plus an unknown number of armoured vehicles which had been recovered and in 2003 John Latimer recorded  and  tanks.

Victoria Cross
Lieutenant-Colonel Victor Turner was awarded the Victoria Cross for his part in the battle.

See also 
 List of British military equipment of World War II
 List of German military equipment of World War II
 List of Italian Army equipment in World War II

Notes

Footnotes

References

Further reading

External links

 A memoir, War Illustrated 
 NY Times, 2 November 1942
 Smith, Colin Extracts of Alamein
 Major Tom Bird obituary, Daily Telegraph 19 September 2017
 Location of Outpost Snipe

Outpost Snipe
1942 in Egypt
Western Desert campaign
Rifle Brigade (Prince Consort's Own)
Outpost Snipe
Outpost Snipe
Outpost Snipe